Stazzona is a comune (municipality) in the Province of Como in the Italian region Lombardy, located about  north of Milan and about  northeast of Como.

Stazzona borders the following municipalities: Consiglio di Rumo, Dongo, Germasino.

Demographic evolution

References

Cities and towns in Lombardy